Jack Keenan may refer to:

 Jack Keenan (American football) (1919–1977), American football guard
 Jack Keenan (baseball) (1869–1909), American baseball pitcher
 Jack Keenan (boxer) (1929-2009), Canadian boxer
 Jack Keenan (footballer) (1864–1906), English footballer

See also
 John Keenan (disambiguation)